Edward James Sexsmith (29 August 1865 – 5 April 1946) was a Canadian politician, farmer and minister. Sexsmith was a Progressive party member of the House of Commons of Canada. He was born in Richmond Township, Lennox and Addington County, Canada West.

He was elected to Parliament at the Lennox and Addington riding in the 1921 general election. After serving his only federal term, the 14th Canadian Parliament, he was defeated at his new riding of Prince Edward—Lennox by John Hubbs of the Conservatives in the 1925 federal election.

External links
 

1865 births
1946 deaths
Canadian farmers
Members of the House of Commons of Canada from Ontario
Progressive Party of Canada MPs